= José Adonis Lavaire =

José Adonis Lavaire is Honduras's Minister of Industry and Commerce.
